Purine synthesis may either refer to:

 in vivo purine synthesis: Purine metabolism#Biosynthesis
 laboratory purine synthesis: Purine#Laboratory synthesis